Temple Oheb Shalom (Hebrew; Lovers of Peace) is a Reform synagogue in Baltimore, Maryland. The highest point in the city is located in its parking lot.

History
The congregation was founded in 1853 by Jewish immigrants from German Confederation member states, Hungary, and Czech territories; pioneer Reform rabbi Isaac Mayer Wise had considerable influence in the congregation's establishment. Its first home was on Hanover Street near Camden Yards.

Benjamin Szold was rabbi from 1859 to 1892; his daughter Henrietta Szold was the founder of Hadassah. Szold had a moderating effect on the march of Oheb Shalom toward Reform practice. He encouraged Sabbath observance and replaced Wise's Minhag America with his own traditional Abodat Yisroel siddur. William Rosenau succeeded him (1892-1940).

In 1892 the congregation built the Eutaw Place Temple, designed by architect Joseph Evans Sperry who modeled it after the Great Synagogue of Florence in the fashionable Moorish Revival style. The congregation sold the building to the Prince Hall Masons in 1961.

In 1953 the congregation acquired land in Pikesville, and finished construction on its present building on Park Heights Avenue, designed by Sheldon I. Leavitt with consulting architect Walter Gropius in 1960. The design is dominated by four large vaults and Gropius saw the design as a modern combination of "the turbine with the Torah." Gropius' design also had an atypical design, with the sanctuary floor ascending toward the bimah on the eastern wall; this design was later reversed so that the floor descends toward the bimah on the western wall.

References

External links
 

1853 establishments in Maryland
1960 establishments in Maryland
Czech-American culture in Baltimore
Czech-Jewish culture in the United States
Fallstaff, Baltimore
German-Jewish culture in Baltimore
Hungarian-Jewish culture in the United States
Modernist architecture in Maryland
Religious organizations established in 1853
Reform synagogues in Maryland
Slovak-American culture in Maryland
Slovak-Jewish culture in the United States
Synagogues completed in 1960
Synagogues in Baltimore
Walter Gropius buildings